Sitabani Wildlife Reserve is a wildlife reserve in the Nainital district of Uttarakhand. It is home to a variety of flora and fauna, including leopards, tigers, and over 500 species of resident and migrating birds throughout the year.

History
Sitabani was subject to years of slash and burn agriculture by the local villagers. As a result, the land became degraded and the moisture profile of the soil dropped. The surrounding forests contained dense numbers of ungulates including deer, nilgais, and wild boars that regularly destroyed crops. Also, domestic animals like cows, buffalo, goats, and even dogs would often be hunted by tigers and leopards. Sitabani was converted into a jungle habitat over the next few years. Some higher barren parts of the estate were gradually made green by planting fruit trees, such as Indian figs, Jamun, Wild Mango, Bhimal, Rohini, and Jackfruit. These trees naturally attracted birds and other wild herbivores. Water bodies were dug out to store excess rainwater, and with time these man-made ponds provided homes for fish, amphibians, insects and turtles. In drier months, many of the wild animals from the neighboring hills started coming to these ponds for water. Many endemic bamboo species were planted, which also served to feed deer and passing elephants. Many local villagers were inducted and employed at the reserve by the founder Abhishek Ray thereby generating revenue through Eco-tourism and creating a sustainable conservation area.

Animals 
Being a part of the Trans-Himalayan birding corridor, the reserve gets both plain and mountain birds during latitudinal and attitudinal migration patterns. Some Himalayan animal species, like Himalayan Black Bear, Himalayan weasel, Yellow-throat Pine Marten, Himalayan Goral, and Himalayan Serow also visit the reserve, especially during the colder months. Indian leopards in this reserve inhabit the craggy cliffs and gorges to avoid interaction with their dominant predator, the Royal-Bengal Tiger. This tiger species prefers the thick forested valleys and lowlands. Herds of Asiatic Elephants pass through the reserve when migrating between the core and buffer areas of Jim Corbett National Park. Altitudinal and geographical variations and diverse flora, combined with direct connectivity with Jim Corbett National Park on one side and the Nainital Forest Division on the other, makes this reserve a natural tiger, leopard, and birding corridor of strategic conservation value.

References

External links
 http://sitabani.business.site

Tiger reserves of India
Protected areas with year of establishment missing
Wildlife sanctuaries in Uttarakhand
Nainital district